Jenin could refer to the following places:

Jenin, a city in Palestine
Jenin, Poland, a village in Poland
Jenin, Syria,  a village in the Tartus Governorate, Syria